The 2003 Triple J Hottest 100, announced on 25 January 2004, was the eleventh such countdown of the most popular songs of the year, according to listeners of the Australian radio station Triple J. As in previous years, a CD featuring 40 (not necessarily the top 40) songs was released. A DVD, containing film clips of songs from the Hottest 100 was also released. A countdown of the videos of each song was shown on the ABC music series Rage in March.

Full list
Note: Australian artists

47 of the 100 tracks were by Australian artists, marked with a green background

Trivia
Powderfinger were the first band ever to get three songs in the top 10. Frenzal Rhomb holds the record of having the shortest song on a Hottest 100 ever, with "Russell Crowe's Band" at 1:12.

Artists with multiple entries
The following individuals or groups had more than one entry in the Hottest 100:

Five entries
White Stripes (3, 14, 89, 93, 94)
Powderfinger (4, 7, 10, 76, 77)
Three entries
The Cat Empire (6, 37, 100)
Jack Johnson (17, 24, 40)
Placebo (30, 72, 95)
Muse (31, 42, 69)
Two entries
Jet (1, 19)
The John Butler Trio (8, 51)
Hilltop Hoods (9, 44)
Something for Kate (11, 62)
The Waifs (12, 50)
The Dandy Warhols (13, 32)
Butterfingers (15, 38)
Little Birdy (16, 25)
Ben Harper (18, 29)
Pete Murray (20, 86)
Epicure (21, 73)
The Living End (23, 66)
Ben Folds (One with The Bens) (27, 52)
Electric Six (28, 33)
Michael Franti and Spearhead (34, 47)
Magic Dirt (35, 60)
The Beautiful Girls (41, 62)
The Strokes (43, 83)
A Perfect Circle (45, 70)
Radiohead (48, 49)
Missy Elliott (57, 85)
AFI (58, 71)
Cody ChesnuTT (One solo and one with The Roots) (74, 75)

Top 10 Albums of 2003
Bold indicates winner of the Hottest 100.

CD release

DVD release

The Hottest 100 DVD was the second such DVD, after the 2002 release.

 Jet – Are You Gonna Be My Girl
 Jane's Addiction – Just Because
 The Dandy Warhols – We Used To Be Friends
 Something for Kate – Déjà Vu (Radio Edit)
 Cody ChesnuTT – Look Good in Leather
 Little Birdy – Baby Blue
 The Sleepy Jackson – Vampire Racecourse
 The Herd – 77%
 The John Butler Trio – Zebra
 Placebo – The Bitter End
 Radiohead – There There
 Basement Jaxx – Good Luck (featuring Lisa Kekaula)
 Electric Six – Gay Bar
 The Waifs – Lighthouse
 Magic Dirt – Plastic Loveless Letter
 AFI – The Leaving Song Pt. II
 Pete Murray – Feeler
 The Mars Volta – Inertiatic ESP (Album Version)
 The Living End – Who's Gonna Save Us
 The Cat Empire – Hello
 Chicks on Speed (featuring Peaches) – We Don't Play Guitars
 Ben Harper – Diamonds On the Inside
 Butterfingers – I Love Work
 Missy Higgins – Greed For Your Love
 Chemical Brothers – The Golden Path
 Offcutts – Break It Down, James Brown
 Machine Gun Fellatio – Voices in My Head
 NOFX – Franco Un-American
 The Butterfly Effect – One Second of Insanity
 Michael Franti and Spearhead – Everyone Deserves Music
 Belle and Sebastian – Step into My Office, Baby
 Junior Senior – Move Your Feet (Radio Edit)
 Missy Elliott – Pass That Dutch
 Powderfinger – (Baby I've Got You) On My Mind

See also
2003 in music

Notes

2003
2003 in Australian music
Australia Triple J